The Kerala State Film Award for Best Music Director winners:

Superlatives

Winners

Special Jury Award and Special Jury Mention In This Category

Most Awards

References

External links
Official website
PRD, Govt. of Kerala: Awardees List
Malayalam Cinema

Kerala State Film Awards